Župkov is a village and municipality in the Žarnovica District, Banská Bystrica Region in Slovakia.

External links
http://www.statistics.sk/mosmis/eng/run.html

Villages and municipalities in Žarnovica District